Eman Ukpa is a village in Uruan local government area of Akwa Ibom State, Nigeria inhabited by the Ibibio people.

References 

Villages in Akwa Ibom